Vathi is a neighborhood of Athens. It is located north of Athens' downtown and is part of the first suburb of the city. The center of the neighborhood is Vathis Square (Plateía Váthis).

References

Neighbourhoods in Athens